Civic Center is a station of Phase II of Line 1, Zhengzhou Metro. The station was opened on 12 January 2017.

Station layout  
The station has 2 floors underground. The B1 floor is for the station concourse and the B2 floor is for the platforms and tracks. The station has one island platform and two tracks for Line 1.

Exits

References 

Stations of Zhengzhou Metro
Line 1, Zhengzhou Metro
Railway stations in China opened in 2017